Ok Tedi Mining Limited is a Papua New Guinean company that administers the Ok Tedi Mine in the northern part of the Western Province. Its main office is located in Tabubil and the building is known as the White House. Its chairman, since 2014, has been former Deputy Prime Minister Moi Avei.

Women in mining 
Ok Tedi Women’s Network (OWN) is a local organization that works on issues effecting the company's female employees. The World Bank has studied OWN as a model for treatment of women in the mining industry. The group handles a wide range of topics, from honoring girls and women in science to critical cancer awareness.

One of Ok Tedi's senior employees and representatives to OWN, Samantha Andreas, was the Westpac Women in Business' Young Achiever award recipient in 2008.

See also
Ok Tedi environmental disaster
Papua New Guinea
Ok Tedi Mine

References

Copper mining companies of Papua New Guinea
Gold mining companies of Papua New Guinea